Sweet Memories (also known as Sweet Memories of Yesterday and Sweetheart Days) is a 1911 silent short romantic drama film, written and directed by Thomas H. Ince, released by the Independent Moving Pictures Company on March 27, 1911.

Plot
Polly Biblett (Mary Pickford), a young lady, tells her grandmother Lettie about her new boyfriend. The news provokes the elderly woman to reminisce about her own sweetheart, long time before. The touching sequence expresses the power of lives going on, the older woman aging as her grandchildren grow and knowing they will soon have children of their own.

Cast
 Mary Pickford as Polly Biblett
 King Baggot as Edward Jackson
 Owen Moore as Ashton Orcutt - Duelist
 Jack Pickford Young Earl Jackson (as Johnny Pickford)
 Lottie Pickford as Young Lettie Terrell
 Charles Arling - Undetermined Role (uncredited)	
 Charlotte Smith Pickford as Lettie Terrell Jackson (uncredited)

References

External links 

 

1911 films
1911 romantic drama films
American black-and-white films
American silent short films
American romantic drama films
Films directed by Thomas H. Ince
1911 short films
Independent Moving Pictures films
Films produced by Carl Laemmle
1910s American films
Silent romantic drama films
Silent American drama films
1910s English-language films